César Omar Taborda (born January 23, 1984) is an Argentine football goalkeeper who plays for Nueva Chicago.

Career
Taborda played youth football for Estudiantes de La Plata from 2002 to 2004, when he signed his first professional contract. Before making any appearance for the first team, he was loaned to second division side Defensa y Justicia for the 2006–07 season, where he played 31 games. Upon his return to Estudiantes, he was relegated to third choice goalkeeper behind Mariano Andújar and Damián Albil.

In 2009, Taborda had a 6-month period on loan at O'Higgins in Chile, where he played 18 games. After his second return to Estudiantes, he played his first game for the team replacing Albil in the 16th minute of the first half of a 0–1 defeat to Argentinos Juniors, for the 2009 Apertura. The following fixture, he had his first start in a 1–1 draw with Lanús. With this participation, Taborda became the first goalkeeper from Estudiantes' youth divisions to start for the team since Nicolás Tauber in 2002.

Taborda was Albil's substitute in Estudiantes' 2009 FIFA Club World Cup runner-up participation, and was Agustín Orión's substitute in the team's 2010 Apertura winning campaign. In the latter, he played four games, two as a starter and two coming on as a substitute for an injured Orión. He also started in the two games of the 2010 Recopa Sudamericana, due to Orión being suspended.

Honours
Estudiantes
Argentine Primera División (1): 2010 Apertura

References

External links
  
 
 

Living people
1984 births
People from Constitución Department
Association football goalkeepers
Argentine footballers
Argentine expatriate footballers
Argentine Primera División players
Primera Nacional players
Torneo Federal A players
Primera B Metropolitana players
Chilean Primera División players
Estudiantes de La Plata footballers
San Martín de Tucumán footballers
Defensa y Justicia footballers
O'Higgins F.C. footballers
Independiente Rivadavia footballers
Aldosivi footballers
Chacarita Juniors footballers
Central Córdoba de Santiago del Estero footballers
Guillermo Brown footballers
Nueva Chicago footballers
Argentine expatriate sportspeople in Chile
Expatriate footballers in Chile
Sportspeople from Santa Fe Province